Sela may refer to:

People

Surname 
Avraham Sela (born 1950), Israeli political scientist
Dudi Sela (born 1985), Israeli tennis player
Jonas Sela (born 1984), German footballer
 Jonathan Sela (born 1978), French-born Israeli cinematographer
Lhasa de Sela (1972–2010), American singer
Luke Sela (1943–2007), Papua New Guinea journalist
Michael Sela (1924–2022), Israeli immunologist; President of the Weizmann Institute of Science
Yoel Sela (born 1951), Israeli Olympic competitive sailor
Zlil Sela, Israeli mathematician

Given name 
Sela Molisa (born 1952), Vanuatu politician
Sela Ward (born 1956), American actress
Sela Guia (born 2000), Filipina Actress and Singer

Places
Sela, Kalinovik, Bosnia and Herzegovina
Sela, Croatia
Sela, Eritrea
Selá (Vopnafjörður), a river of Iceland
Sela Pass, India
Sela, Highland Papua
Sela (Edom), Jordan
Sela, Bijelo Polje, Montenegro
Sela, Trøndelag, Norway
Sela (Saudi Arabia), a mountain
Sela, Osilnica, Slovenia
Selaa, Lebanon

Other uses
Latin American Economic System
Southeast Louisiana Urban Flood Control Project
Sela (Star Trek), a fictional character in the television series Star Trek
"Se La", a song by Lionel Richie
 SELA, Hebrew abbreviation for "Students before Parents", an Israeli immigration program for Jewish youth

See also
Selo (disambiguation)
Sella (disambiguation)
Selah (disambiguation)
Nova Sela (disambiguation)